Events from the year 2000 in the European Union.

Incumbents
 President of the European Council
 António Guterres (Jan – Jun 2000)
 Jacques Chirac (July – Dec 2000)
 Commission President -  Romano Prodi 
 Council Presidency -  Portugal (Jan – Jun 2000) and  France (July – Dec 2000)

Events
 1 January - Portugal takes over the Presidency of the European Union.
 3 May - The European Commission recommends that Greece become the 12th member of the Eurozone.
 1 July - France takes over the Presidency of the European Union.
 28 September - In a referendum, the electorate of Denmark votes against membership of the Euro.

References

 
Years of the 20th century in the European Union
2000s in the European Union